Paul Blainey is an investigator and core faculty member at the Broad Institute in Boston, Massachusetts, and assistant professor of biological engineering at MIT. He is recognized for his work in single cell genomics.

Blainey studied mathematics and chemistry as an undergraduate at the University of Washington. He continued his studies in physical chemistry at Harvard University, earning an MS and PhD. He did a postdoc at Stanford University, where he developed high-throughput methods for whole-genome amplification of DNA from individual microbial cells in Dr. Stephen Quake’s laboratory.

Awards 
 Burroughs Wellcome Fund Career Awards at the Scientific Interface, 2011
 Agilent Early Career Investigator Award, 2014
 2017 NIH New Innovator Award

References

External links
 

Year of birth missing (living people)
Living people
MIT School of Engineering faculty
Harvard Graduate School of Arts and Sciences alumni
American geneticists